INS Vagli (S42) was a  diesel-electric submarine of the Indian Navy, commissioned in 1974. Along with her sister ship Vela, she spent almost 10 years undergoing a protracted refit by Hindustan Shipyard. After 36 years of active service, INS Vagli was decommissioned on 9 December 2010.

References

Foxtrot-class submarines
Ships built in the Soviet Union
1973 ships
Vela-class submarines
Submarines of India
Museum ships in India